An  is a Norwegian legal form, mainly used in small and medium-sized enterprises, in which the company's individual owners are held personally liable for any outstanding debts acquired by the company. It is similar to a general partnership.

If any participant is unable to pay a share of the debt, it can be collected in full from the other participants. The term is usually abbreviated ANS when used in company names.

It is a widespread form of company in smaller, low-risk business areas. For more economically-risky ventures, an AS would be preferable, as the personal financial losses in the event of a bankruptcy would be limited to the capital invested: a bankrupted AS with a 2 million NOK debt, the investors would stand to lose the invested capital, for instance 100 thousand NOK.

In the case of several owners, if one is unable to pay, the entire sum would be collected from the others.

A business does not need to include the abbreviation for its type in its day-to-day operations, but it is required to register this in its legal name. As an example, a self-employed plumber in an ANS could name his shop "John Smith Plumbing", but his mail address, legal documents and so forth would have to carry the name "John Smith Plumbing ANS".

Types of companies of Norway